The 1963 Pacific Tigers football team represented the University of the Pacific during the 1963 NCAA University Division football season.

Pacific competed as an independent in 1963. They played home games in Pacific Memorial Stadium in Stockton, California. In their third (and last) season under head coach John Rohde, the Tigers finished with a record of two wins and eight losses (2–8). This was the worst record for the Tigers since they were winless in the last year of World War II (1945). For the 1963 season they were outscored by their opponents 99–275.

Schedule

Team players in the AFL/NFL
The following University of the Pacific players were selected in the 1964 NFL Draft.

The following University of the Pacific players were selected in the 1964 AFL Draft.

The following finished their college career at Pacific, were not drafted, but played in the AFL starting with the 1964 season.

Notes

References

Pacific
Pacific Tigers football seasons
Pacific Tigers football